The Launière Lake is a freshwater body crossed by the Launière River in the unorganized territory of Lac-Jacques-Cartier, in the La Côte-de-Beaupré Regional County Municipality, in the administrative region of Capitale-Nationale, in the province of Quebec, in Canada. This body of water is located in the Laurentides Wildlife Reserve.

A few secondary forest roads serve this area for forestry and recreational tourism activities.

Forestry is the main economic activity in the sector; recreational tourism, second.

The surface of Lac Launière is usually frozen from the beginning of December to the end of March, however the safe circulation on the ice is generally made from mid-December to mid-March.

Geography 
This lake sunk between the mountains is made in length by more or less marrying the shape of the letter L.

Lac Launière receives the discharge from Lac La Giroflée on the east side and the discharge from Lac Frazie on the west side.

From the mouth of Lac Launière, the current descends on  following the course of the Launière River. Then the current follows the course of the Jacques-Cartier River for  generally south to the northeast bank of the St. Lawrence river.

Toponymy 
Thomas-Edmond Giroux reports Michel Launier, of Innu origin, had his hunting territory there. It is designated on the map of Commissioner Flynn, of the Crown Lands department, in 1896, in the form "Lac à Launier". The first mention in the form "Lac Launière" was noted on a map in 1915.

The toponym Lac Launière was formalized on December 5, 1968, by the Commission de toponymie du Québec.

See also 
 St. Lawrence River
 List of lakes of Canada

References

External links 
 Official website of Laurentides Wildlife Reserve

La Côte-de-Beaupré Regional County Municipality
Laurentides Wildlife Reserve